Martin Ambrose Foran (November 11, 1844 – June 28, 1921) was an American lawyer, jurist, politician, and Civil War veteran who served as a U.S. Representative from Ohio for three terms from 1883 to 1889.

Early life and education 
Foran was born in Choconut Township, Susquehanna County, Pennsylvania. He lived on his father's farm and learned the art of coopering. Foran attended the public schools and St. Joseph's College.

He taught school three years and also spent two years in Ireland.

Civil War 
He served as a private in the Fourth Regiment, Pennsylvania Volunteer Cavalry, from April 1864 to July 1865.

Career
After the war, he taught for a few months. He found work as a cooper at Meadville, Pennsylvania, and moved to Cleveland, Ohio, March 11, 1868. He was prominent in his trade and was president of the Coopers' International Union, and editor of the Coopers Journal from 1870 to 1874.
He served as a member of the State constitutional convention of Ohio in 1873.
He studied law.
He was admitted to the bar in 1874 and commenced practice in Cleveland.
He served as prosecuting attorney for the city of Cleveland 1875–1877.

Congress 
Foran was elected as a Democrat to the Forty-eighth, Forty-ninth, and Fiftieth Congresses (March 4, 1883 – March 4, 1889).
He was not a candidate for reelection.

Later career and death 
He resumed the practice of law in Cleveland, Ohio.
He served as judge of the court of common pleas from January 1911 until his death in Cleveland, Ohio, June 28, 1921.

He was interred in Lake View Cemetery.

Family life
On December 29, 1868, Foran married Kate Kavanaugh. They had daughters named Gertrude M. and Margaret O. After Kate died, Foran married Emma Kennedy, December 1893.  He was member of the B.P.O.E., Grand Army of the Republic, and the Catholic Church.

References

Sources

External links 
 

1844 births
1921 deaths
Politicians from Cleveland
Burials at Lake View Cemetery, Cleveland
Ohio Constitutional Convention (1873)
Saint Joseph's University alumni
Ohio lawyers
People of Pennsylvania in the American Civil War
Union Army soldiers
Democratic Party members of the United States House of Representatives from Ohio
19th-century American lawyers